Homeland Heritage Park is a historical park in Bartow, Florida, Polk County, Florida. The site includes the 1878 Homeland School building, the 1887 Old Homeland Methodist Church, the former Methodist parsonage and church annex, an English family's log cabin and barn from 1888 and the 1880 Raulerson House. Homeland Heritage Park is located at 249 Church Avenue in Homeland, Florida.

See also
List of museums in Florida

External links
Homeland Heritage Park Polk County

Museums in Polk County, Florida
Bartow, Florida
Open-air museums in Florida